William H. Riffee was Dean of the University of Florida College of Pharmacy.   Prior to his position at the UF College of Pharmacy, he was a professor at the University of Texas from 1975 until 1996.

Education
 B.S. degree in Pharmacy from West Virginia University in 1967.
 Ph.D. in Pharmacology from Ohio State University in 1975.

External links
Message from the Dean
Riffee's Profile on Educase

Living people
West Virginia University alumni
University of Florida faculty
Year of birth missing (living people)
Ohio State University Graduate School alumni